Tomáš Bábek (born 4 June 1987) is a Czech track cyclist. He shared the men's sprint title with Adam Ptáčník and Denis Špička at the Czech Track Cycling Championships, and later represented the Czech Republic at the 2008 Summer Olympics. On that same year, Babek also claimed the bronze medal in the 1 km time trial at the European Championships in Pruszków, Poland.

Babek qualified for the Czech squad in the men's team sprint at the 2008 Summer Olympics in Beijing by receiving one of the team's three available berths based on UCI's selection process from the Track World Rankings. Babek and his teammates Ptacnik and Spicka battled in an opening heat against the U.S. trio of Michael Blatchford, Giddeon Massie, and Adam Duvendeck with an eleventh-place time in 45.678 and an average speed of 59.109 km/h, failing to advance further to the top eight match round.

Career highlights

2007
  Czech Track Cycling Championships (1 km time trial), Brno (CZE)
2008
  Czech Track Cycling Championships (1 km time trial), Brno (CZE)
  Czech Track Cycling Championships (Team sprint with Adam Ptáčník and Denis Špička), Brno (CZE)
  European Championships (1 km time trial), Pruszków (POL)
 11th Olympic Games (Team sprint with Adam Ptáčník and Denis Špička), Beijing (CHN)
2010
 12th UCI World Championships (Team sprint), Copenhagen (DEN)
 32nd UCI World Championships (Sprint), Copenhagen (DEN)
2012
  Czech Track Cycling Championships (1 km time trial), Brno (CZE)
2013
  Czech Track Cycling Championships (Keirin), Brno (CZE)

References

External links
 
 NBC 2008 Olympics profile

1987 births
Living people
Czech male cyclists
Czech track cyclists
Cyclists at the 2008 Summer Olympics
Olympic cyclists of the Czech Republic
Sportspeople from Brno
Cyclists at the 2019 European Games
European Games medalists in cycling
European Games gold medalists for the Czech Republic
Cyclists at the 2020 Summer Olympics
21st-century Czech people